Panthro is a fictional character of the ThunderCats franchise. He is the strongest and usually associated with strength of body and will. He wields a set of nunchaku given to him by Jaga before arriving on Earth. The role he plays for the team ranges from warrior to mechanic, and occasionally counsel for the young Lion-O. Normally exemplified by a cheerful disposition, he is, however, also quick to lose his temper (sometimes even with Snarf's pranks) and has a paralyzing fear of bats and a dislike of spiders.

1985 series

Panthro is a mechanic and elder of the Thundercats. He was played by Earle Hyman. Panthro is based on a panther.

2011 series

Panthro is a soldier of the Thunderian Army who disappeared. In this version he is larger and more muscular than the supporting cast. He is portrayed by Kevin Michael Richardson. Panthro also cannot swim.

Thundercats Roar

Panthro appears in the 2020 version of ThunderCats.

In popular culture
Kenan Thompson appeared dressed as Panthro during Chadwick Boseman's monologue on Saturday Night Live in 2019.

Reception
Panthro has received a mixed reception by critics. Some have praised the character for being racially inclusive. Other critics have complained that the character has stereotypical African American traits. io9 ranked Panthro the 7th best ThunderCats character. Comic Book Resources ranked Panthro the 7th worst ThunderCats character.

References

Anthropomorphic animal characters
Fictional characters who can stretch themselves
Fictional characters with superhuman strength
Extraterrestrial characters in television
Fictional humanoids
Fictional mechanics
Fictional nunchakuka
Fictional panthers
Fictional refugees
Fictional soldiers
Male characters in animated series
Martial artist characters in television
Television characters introduced in 1985
ThunderCats